Proty and Proty II (often simply called "Proty" as well) are two fictional extraterrestrials in the DC Comics universe. Belonging to a race of telepathic shape-shifters called Proteans, native to a planet in the Antares system, both became allies of the Legion of Super-Heroes. The original Proty first appeared in Adventure Comics #308 (May 1963) where Chameleon Boy adopted him as a pet.

After the death of the original Proty, Proty II debuted in Superman's Pal Jimmy Olsen #72 (October 1963). The second Proty was Chameleon Boy's pet then later become Saturn Girl's pet. He joined the Legion of Super-Pets and was eventually considered a full member of the Legion of Super-Heroes itself. Since Legion of Super-Heroes history was rebooted in 1994 (as a result of the DC Comics crossover Zero Hour), Proty has rarely been seen or referenced. During the crossover DC One Million, it was revealed that a hero called Proty One Million existed in the 853rd century and was a member of the Justice Legion of Super-Zoomorphs.

Fictional character biography
According to Adventure Comics #334 (1965), a race called the Llorn create a colony on the planet in the Antares system already inhabited by a race of peaceful, simple animals of some intelligence that resembled soft boulders. The Llorn label these intelligent native animals as "Proteans". The two races live in harmony for years until the planet's sun temporarily becomes unstable. Increased sunspot activity upsets the ecological balance of the planet, killing many Proteans and Llorn and destroying the colony city. The Llorn realize the planet will soon suffer drastic changes to the climate and environment that will make the environment inhospitable for them. They decide to evacuate but cannot bring the whole Protean race with them, nor can the Proteans leave on their own. The Llorn use their advanced technology, an "evolution ray", to alter the natives into Proteans into life forms that can now change their shape and structure, allowing them to survive any new environment the planet develops. When floods arrive, the Proteans become fish-like life. When a new ice age occurs, the Proteans become animals similar to polar bears. When they need to migrate, they become winged creatures and fly to a new location.

Proty I 
During the 30th century, a "Protean beast" is captured and taken to an alien menagerie. He is later rescued by the Legion of Super-Heroes, a group of teenagers who protect the citizens of the United Planets. Shape-shifting member Chameleon Boy adopts the Protean creature as a pet, calling him "Proty". The affectionate alien proves useful to the Legion, and becomes quite close to Saturn Girl, as her telepathic abilities allow her to read its thoughts.

Legion founder Garth Ranzz, the hero called Lightning Lad, dies. Scientists of teammate Mon-El's home world Daxam develop a machine that can use lightning to transfer life force from one person to another, reviving the recently dead but killing the "donor" in the process. Proty reads the mind of Saturn Girl, another Legion founder and a telepath, and learns she intends to sacrifice her life to revive Lightning Lad. Proty tricks her into becoming lost in a cave, disguises himself as her, and becomes the sacrifice who restores Lightning Lad to life.

Following the 1985-1986 crossover Crisis on Infinite Earths, the Legion of Super-Heroes was reimagined as group of older, grittier characters living in a darker world of "Five Years Later". The "Five Years Later" era involved many revelations and revisions to characters. A story published in 1992 revealed the original Proty's sacrifice didn't resurrect Garth Rannz but did transfer the Protean's life force and consciousness into the young hero's body. Now inhabiting Garth's body, Proty lived his life as Lightning Lad from that point forward. This retcon was criticized by some fans as being inconsistent with several stories. This was later indicated to be the result of the Legion enemy Glorith creating an alternate timeline, removing the idea from Legion canon.

Proty II 
Soon after the death of Proty, Chameleon Boy is shown as having another Protean as a pet. The pet is officially named Proty II or Proty Two, but many in the Legion simply call him "Proty". Proty II later becomes a member of the Legion of Super-Pets, a team of super-powered animals who live in the 20th century and were originally formed by the Legion when animal help was needed. The Legion of Super-Pets mainly operate as separate beings, only joining together when their unique team is required. Through time travel technology, Proty is able to join them on several missions. In the stories of the "Adult Legion" (taking place further in the future, when the teenage heroes are fully grown adults), Proty II is a full member of the Legion and is considered the pet of Saturn Woman (an older version of Saturn Girl), having had a falling out with Chameleon Man (the Adult Legion version of Chameleon Boy).

By the late 1970s, Proty II largely disappears from comics. In Legion of Super-Heroes Vol. 2 #300 and 301 (1983), Proty II is briefly seen, no longer a pet but an independent sentient being recognized by new laws as having full rights like any other citizen of the United Planets of the 30th century. He now works as a professional photographer and prefers to be called by his "full name" rather than simply as Proty, not wishing to be confused with his predecessor. After photographing the new official Legion portrait, he seems slightly resentful that the team considered him a "pet" in the past and makes a sarcastic remark about no longer attending meetings of the Legion of Super-Pets.

Post-Zero Hour
The 1994 crossover Zero Hour rebooted Legion continuity. In the new continuity, the Protean race attacks Earth while the Legion is facing the Fatal Five. The civilian members of the Legion manage to destroy all but one of the Proteans, who is then adopted as a pet by Lori Morning and named "Proty". During the crossover Final Crisis, it was revealed that the original Legion timeline (and thus the original versions of Proty and Proty II) still exists elsewhere in the multiverse.

DC Rebirth 
The mainstream DC Comics canon was revised again in 2016 following DC Rebirth. In the new canon, a modern version of the Legion of Super-Pets appears in Super Sons Annual #1 (2017). In the story, a creature roughly resembling Proty is part of the team, known as Clay Critter. It is unclear if this is a new version of Proty or a creature related to the Gotham City character Clayface.

DC One Million 
The crossover DC One Million introduced readers to a possible future in the 853rd century, where many solar systems were defended by heroes who either carried the legacy of modern-day DC heroes or were literal descendants, such as the Justice Legion-A. In DC One Million #4 (1998), super-powered animals appeared and were said to be "veterans" of the Justice Legion of Super-Zoomorphs. A news broadcast then stated the team of animals were being led into battle by a being called Proty One Million and another super-animal called Master Mind (possibly a descendant or successor of the worm villain Mister Mind), though neither character made an appearance in the story.

The later comic DC 1 Million 80-Page Giant #1 revealed that in the 853rd century there are many teams of super-powered animals known as Legion of Super-Familiars, inspired by the original Legion of Super-Pets and overseen by the Legion of Executive Familiars. It's possible the Justice Legion of Super-Zoomorphs is one of these teams or is unrelated.

Powers and abilities
Proty I and II are beings of protoplasm capable of taking on any shape or form. This shape-shifting is intense enough that they can alter how they bodies process oxygen or regulate temperature, such as when they became polar bear-like creatures to survive an ice age or fish-like creatures to live in the water. With their malleable bodies and resistance to different environments, Proteans can survive in the vacuum of space. While they can make their bodies look like any object, they cannot take on all its properties. While they can mimic physical traits of many animals and beings, such as growing wings in order to fly or fins so they can swim at great speeds, they cannot mimic superhuman abilities or learned skills and natural talents. Likewise, they cannot completely mimic the mass and physical strength of inorganic substances. Becoming a bear will increase Proty's strength but he cannot mimic a brick wall and in the process become as resilient to damage.

While the original Proty (like most of his race) was mute his whole life, Proty II eventually developed a working tongue and voice box, allowing verbal communication.

Proteans have low-level telepathic abilities, which allow them to read someone's surface thoughts. With this ability, they can understand any language spoken to them, understand the intentions of strangers who may be friend or foe, and can take on forms they see in a person's mind.

References

External links
Proty at the Legion of Super-Heroes Clubhouse
Proteans at the Unofficial Guide to the DC Universe

Articles about multiple fictional characters
Characters created by Edmond Hamilton
Characters created by John Forte
Comics characters introduced in 1963
DC Comics aliens
DC Comics characters who are shapeshifters
DC Comics extraterrestrial superheroes
DC Comics telepaths
Legion of Super-Pets